The politics of Shaanxi Province in the People's Republic of China is structured in a dual party-government system like all other governing institutions in mainland China.

The Governor of Shaanxi is the highest-ranking official in the People's Government of Shaanxi. However, in the province's dual party-government governing system, the Governor is considered to have less power than the Shaanxi Chinese Communist Party (CCP) Provincial Committee Secretary, colloquially termed the "Shaanxi CCP Party Chief"; since the Governor is always ranked as the First-Deputy Secretary in the Shaanxi Chinese Communist Party Provincial Committee.

Shaanxi was established as a provincial government since the Yuan Dynasty. On 10 January 1950, the People's Government of Shaanxi was established in Xi'an. Ma Minfang was then appointed as both the first Governor and CCP chief of Shaanxi.

List of CCP secretaries

List of governors

List of chairmen of Shaanxi People's Congress

List of chairmen of Shaanxi CPPCC
Ma Mingfang: 1949–1952
Pan Zili: 1952–1955
zhang Desheng: 1955－1960
Fang Zhongru: 1960－1963
Zhao Shouyi: 1963－1967
Li Ruishan: 1977－1979
Lv Jianren: 1979－1985
Tan Weixu: 1985－1988
Zhou Yaguang: 1988－1998
An Qiyuan: 1998－2003
Ai Peishan: 2003－2006
Ma Zhongping: 2008－2016
Han Yong: 2016－2022
Xu Xinrong(徐新荣): 2022-present

See also 
Politics of the People's Republic of China

Shaanxi
Shaanxi
Shaanxi